"Lebdeğmez  atışma" or "Dudak değmez aşık atışması" in Turkey, whose literal meaning in Turkish is "two troubadours throwing verses at each other where lips do not touch each other", is the traditional and still practiced event of oratory match, a form of instantaneously improvised poetry sang by opposing Ashiks taking turns for artfully criticising each other with one verse at a time, is done by each first placing a pin between their upper and lower lips so that the improvised song, usually accompanied by a Saz (played by the ashik himself), consists only of labial lipograms i.e. without words where lips must touch each other, effectively excluding the letters B, F, M, P and V from the text of the improvised songs.

See also
Flyting
Skald
Minstrel

References 
 Subtitled short video clip on lebdeğmez from Turkish National Television, TRT
 A duel between two well known ashiks Murat Çobanoğlu and  Şeref Taşlıova
 A short BBC Turkish article on these two ashiks
 video search results for "Leb degmez" on DuckDuckGo, a search engine that claims not to gather or reveal searchers data.

External links

Âşıklık (Minstrelsy) Tradition
Intangible Cultural Heritage Museum in The Heart Of Turkey

 
Constrained writing
Turkic culture
Turkish folk poets
Turkish folklore
Turkish music